Christos Kostis (born 15 January 1972) is a Greek former professional footballer who played as a forward. Kostis is widely regarded to be one of the most technical players Greece has ever produced, but his great injury in 1997 stopped his from making a big career. His nickname was "the Greek Cruyff".

Club career
Kostis begun his professional career at Iraklis, where at a young age became the club's best striker. This made AEK Athens and Olympiacos battle for his signature during the summer of 1994. Olympiakos' and Iraklis' boards agreed for the transfer and Kostis took a plane for Athens in order to sign his new contract with them. Surprisingly, he found waiting for him an the airport, AEK Athens' board as during the flight they made a better offer to Iraklis and signed him for the club's record fee at time of 450 million drachmas. His first season in the team, was a period of adjustment, nevertheless he was the team's first player in appearances in the league scoring 11 times. The following season alongside Batista, Tsiartas, Ketsbaia and Savevski, he formed an incredible offensive midfield line. On 28 October 1995 he scored in the derby against Olympiacos at home making the final 1–1. In 18 November of the same year, he also scored the winner in the Athenian derby against Panathinaikos. On 3 January 1996 he scored at the away win against Olympiacos for the first leg of the round of 16 for the cup. Competing during this particular season mainly on the left flank of the attack, he was again first in appearances in the league scoring 19 times, while he won the Cup with the "yellow-blacks. His best season was in 1996–97, where he won the cup again, while he was again their first player in league appearances and the top scorer with 21 goals. He scored again in the league game against Olympiacos making the final 2–0 for AEK on 13 January 1997. But at the start of the next season his career was cut short when he got seriously injured on 23 October 1997 after a collision with Sturm Graz's goalkeeper Kazimierz Sidorczuk during a game for the Cup Winners' Cup in 23 October. Since then he has virtually never been able to become the same player again. The titles he won with AEK were 3 cups and 1 Super Cup. He underwent surgery, underwent treatments and in 1998, while still injured, Kostis was transferred to Anderlecht, but did not manage to play at all for the Belgian team.

In 2000 and after various surgeries, he returned to AEK, but he had new injuries and was never able to find himself again. On his return to AEK and despite the great effort he made to return to a high level and with the people and the administrations of AEK supporting him as much as they could, he did not succeed. He had only 7 league appearances until 2005 when he left to play for Alki Larnaca in one season. He finished his career playing for Ajax Cape Town in the summer of 2007.

International career
He debuted for the Greece national football team on 10 March 1993 and went to score 4 times during his 15 caps.

After football
Kostis during the period 2012–13 was the general captain of the football department of AEK.

Career statistics

International

Honours

AEK Athens
Greek Cup: 1996–97, 1999–2000, 2001–02
Greek Super Cup: 1996

References

External links

1972 births
Living people
Footballers from Thessaloniki
Greek footballers
Greece international footballers
Greek expatriate footballers
Association football forwards
AEK Athens F.C. players
AEK F.C. non-playing staff
Alki Larnaca FC players
R.S.C. Anderlecht players
Iraklis Thessaloniki F.C. players
Cape Town Spurs F.C. players
Expatriate footballers in Cyprus
Expatriate footballers in Belgium
Expatriate soccer players in South Africa
Super League Greece players
Cypriot Second Division players